Future plc is an international multimedia company established in the United Kingdom in 1985. The company has over 220 brands that span magazines, newsletters, websites, and events in fields such as video games, technology, films, music, photography, home, and knowledge. The company is listed on the London Stock Exchange and is a constituent of the FTSE 250 Index.

The company's media brands reached 313 million people worldwide in 2022 – approximately 1 in 3 adults online in the US and the UK – including 4.8 million in print, and 117 million across social platforms. These include Marie Claire, CinemaBlend, TechRadar, Tom's Guide, Who What Where, and The Week, among many others. Zillah Byng-Thorne has been CEO since 2014; Cheddar founder and former Buzzfeed President Jon Steinberg will take over the role in April 2023.

History

1985–2012 
The company was founded as Future Publishing in Somerton, Somerset, England, in 1985 by Chris Anderson with the sole magazine Amstrad Action. An early innovation was the inclusion of free software on magazine covers. It acquired GP Publications so establishing Future US in 1994. From 1995 to 1997, the company published Arcane, a magazine which largely focused on tabletop games.

Anderson sold Future to Pearson plc for £52.7m in 1994, but bought it back in 1998, with Future chief executive Greg Ingham and Apax Venture Partners, for £142m. The company was the subject of an initial public offering in 1999. Anderson left Future in 2001.

2012–2015 
Future published the official magazines for the consoles of all three major games console manufacturers (Microsoft, Nintendo, and Sony); however PlayStation: The Official Magazine ceased publishing in November 2012, and Official Nintendo Magazine ceased publishing in October 2014.

The company had a period of abandoning print media properties in favour of digital media, closing many titles and selling off others. In January 2012, Future sold its U.S. consumer music magazines, including Guitar World and Revolver, to NewBay Media for $3 million. In April 2013, it completed the sale of major components of its UK media-music brands for £10.2 million to Team Rock Ltd. In September 2013 – but bought these back for £800,000 in 2017 after Team Rock went into administration.

In August 2013, Future acquired two Australian computing titles, APC and TechLife from Bauer Media Group.

Future announced it would cut 55 jobs from its UK operation as part of a restructuring to adapt "more effectively to the company's rapid transition to a primarily digital business model."  The company announced in March 2014 that it would close all of its U.S.-based print publications and shift U.S. print support functions such as consumer marketing, production and editorial leadership for Future's international print brands to the UK. Later in 2014, Future sold its sport and craft titles to Immediate Media, and its auto titles to Kelsey Media.

In March 2014, it was announced that the company's CFO Zillah Byng-Thorne would become the company's fourth CEO in nine years on 1 April 2014, after Mark Wood, CEO since 2011, stepped down.

2016–present 
In 2016, Future started to expand its print and web portfolio through a series of acquisitions. It bought Blaze Publishing to diversify into the shooting market and acquired Noble House Media to increase its interest in telecoms media. Future then completed the purchase of rival specialist magazine publisher Imagine on 21 October 2016 after receiving approval from the Competition and Markets Authority. In 2018, Future made further major acquisitions. It bought the What Hi-Fi?, FourFourTwo, Practical Caravan and Practical Motorhome brands from Haymarket. Future acquired NewBay Media, publisher of numerous broadcast, professional video, and systems integration trade titles, as well as several consumer music magazines. This acquisition returned most of the U.S. consumer music magazines to Future, with the exception of Revolver which had been sold to Project Group M LLC in 2017.

It completed the acquisition of U.S. B2C publisher Purch for $132m by September 2018. Future also purchased nextmedia's computing and tech assets in Australia (including Atomic, Hyper, PC PowerPlay, and PC Tech & Authority) in the same month, and began incorporating PC PowerPlay articles into the online versions of PC Gamer.

In January 2019, Future sold some B2B brands to Datateam Media Group.

In February 2019, Future acquired Mobile Nations including Android Central, iMore, Windows Central and Thrifter for $115 million. Future also acquired ProCycling and CyclingNews.com from Immediate Media.

In July 2019, Future acquired SmartBrief (a digital media publisher of targeted business news and information) for an initial sum of $45 million.

In April 2020, Future acquired TI Media, with 41 brands including Decanter, Country Life, Wallpaper and Woman & Home, for £140 million. Future subsequently divested Amateur Photographer and World Soccer to Kelsey Media and Trusted Reviews to Incisive Media.

In November 2020, Future agreed a £594m takeover of GoCo plc, known for its Gocompare.com price comparison website.

In August 2021, it acquired 12 magazines, including The Week and Computer Active, from Dennis Publishing.

In January 2022, Future signed a deal with Spotlight Sports Group to get sports betting content. As per the deal, Future PLC will include odds-driven modules in content across its FourFourTwo brand. The modules are specifically designed to allow FourFourTwo to build new sports betting value.

In May 2022, Future acquired the women’s lifestyle platform Who What Wear from the US company Clique Brands.

In October 2022, the company acquired men's lifestyle brand ShortList for an undisclosed amount sum.

In February 2023, the company announced that Byng-Thorne would step down on 3 April 2023, with Cheddar founder and former Buzzfeed President and COO Jon Steinberg assuming the role of CEO.

Organisation

The company also owns the American company Future US.

Brands
Future's portfolio of brands skews heavily into technology and gaming, including TechRadar, PC Gamer, Tom's Guide, Tom's Hardware, Marie Claire, GamesRadar+, CinemaBlend, Android Central, IT Pro and Windows Central. As of October 2022, Comscore ranks Future as the 44th most popular media company among users from the United States, behind Conde Nast and Netflix. 

In 2022, the company's media brands reached 313 million people worldwide –
approximately 1 in 3 adults online in the US and the UK – 4.8 million in print, and 117 million across social platforms. Future was described by The Guardian in September 2022 as "one of Europe’s biggest and most successful digital media companies".

References

External links 

 

Computer magazine publishing companies
Magazine publishing companies of the United Kingdom
Companies based in Bath, Somerset
British companies established in 1985
Publishing companies established in 1985
1985 establishments in England
Companies listed on the London Stock Exchange
1999 initial public offerings